Kate Thill (born 25 January 2002) is a Luxembourger footballer who plays as a forward for NCAA Division II team Bridgeport Purple Knights and the Luxembourg women's national team.

International goals

References

2002 births
Living people
Women's association football forwards
Luxembourgian women's footballers
Luxembourg women's international footballers